The Metlar House, also known as the Knapp House, the Bodine House, or the Metlar–Bodine House, is an historic house, now museum, located along River Road in Piscataway, New Jersey. It is also believed to be haunted.  In 2003 a fire badly damaged the house.  The museum has undergone major renovations over the past decade and, as of Summer 2014, is once again open to the public.

The Metlar–Bodine House's "Red, White, and Boom" Madeira wine tasting event on July 6, 2014, kicked off its campaign to raise money to build a new educational wing to house the historically significant Ross Hall Wall.

In July 1778, George Washington headquarters were at Ross Hall and his 11,000 patriots camped along the Raritan River in Piscataway. It was there that General Washington wrote the first order for the United States Army to celebrate the 4th of July – a tradition that continues to this day. The troops were ordered to march across the river on Landing Lane Bridge, line the banks of the Raritan in New Brunswick, and shoot their rifles down and up the line in the first organized salute to the nation's independence. They were then given an extra ration of rum and that evening the General had a party for officers (including Alexander Hamilton, the Marquis de Lafayette and Baron Von Stuben) and their ladies at Ross Hall. The building was destroyed in the 1960s but because of its significance, a parlor wall was saved and was exhibited at the New Jersey Historical Society until it was given to the Township and the Metlar–Bodine House in 2000.

Currently, the parlor wall is dismantled and stored in a large warehouse owned by Piscataway Township. The wall must be restored and relocated to a facility that is climate controlled and protected. It is estimated that the wall's restoration and an addition to the Metlar–Bodine House will cost close to $1 million.

History
In the early 1700s, Raritan Landing, New Jersey had 70 homes belonging to Dutch merchants. In 1728 Peter Bodine, who owned a storehouse, built a two-story house near the Raritan River. In 1733 he sold his house to Hendrick Lane (?-1761). After Lane's death in 1761 this widow, Margaret lived in the house, but in 1780 she sold the property to William French, the son of a sea captain. Isaac Lawrence bought the house from French in 1814. In 1840, William Phillips was the owner and he added an addition to the house.

In the 1890s, the house was owned by George Metlar, of New Brunswick, New Jersey . He used it to house his property manager, John Mason. Metlar's son John moved to the home with his wife in 1904 and shared it with the Mason. In 1914 John Metler inherited the property. John sold some of the land and in 1955 sold the house and the remaining  to John P. Newton.

In 1977 the state of New Jersey purchased the property. They planned to use the property for the New Jersey Route 18 bridge to cross the Raritan River from New Brunswick, New Jersey to Piscataway, New Jersey. It is now owned by the New Jersey Department of Transportation.

On July 17, 2003, a fire damaged the house.

Recent Events
07/06/14: "Red, White and Boom" Madeira wine-tasting event complete with a George Washington impersonator, a colonial dance troupe and a wide variety of catered hors d'oeuvres (including Madeira-roasted clams,  a pickelled vegetable bar and ham salad on grilled cornbread).

04/05/14: Spring annual auction dinner held at Rutgers University.  Some of the items up for grabs were a Franklin mint coin set, the services of a professional sommelier and an exotic vacation getaway to Baja, Mexico!

Annual Events
Spring Annual Auction Dinner

Summer Annual Beer & Pretzel Potluck Picnic (members only)

Bi-annual Antiques River Road Show- Appraisal Fair & Book Sale

Fall Wine Tasting

Holiday Tea

See also
Cornelius Low House
Road Up Raritan Historic District
Ross Hall
List of the oldest buildings in New Jersey

References

External links
 Official website
 History of the house
 HJGA Consulting - restoration plans for the house

Houses on the National Register of Historic Places in New Jersey
Houses in Middlesex County, New Jersey
Museums in Middlesex County, New Jersey
Historic house museums in New Jersey
National Register of Historic Places in Middlesex County, New Jersey
Piscataway, New Jersey
Houses completed in 1728
New Jersey Register of Historic Places
1728 establishments in the Thirteen Colonies